Woodland caribou may refer to two North American reindeer (Rangifer tarandus) populations:
 Boreal woodland caribou
 Migratory woodland caribou

See also 

 Woodland Caribou Provincial Park

Animal common name disambiguation pages